The Rt. Rev. Kwang-Hsu Michael Chang was a bishop of the Anglican Church.
He was educated at Trinity College Foochow and ordained in 1923. He was consecrated an Assistant Bishop of Kwangsi-Hunan on 10 October 1943 and appointed Bishop of Fukien in 1944.

Notes

Anglican missionary bishops in China
1898 births
1973 deaths
19th-century Anglican bishops in China
Anglican bishops of Kwangsi-Hunan
Anglican bishops in Fukien